Clement Barksdale (November 1609 – January 1687) was a prolific English religious author, polymath and Anglican priest. He lost his London parish in the English Civil War, but gained Gloucestershire livings at the Restoration and taught at a private school.

Life
Clement Barksdale was born at Winchcombe, Gloucestershire in November 1609.

After earlier education at John Roysse's Free School in Abingdon, (now Abingdon School), he entered Merton College, Oxford as "a servitor" in Lent term 1625, but moved shortly to Gloucester Hall (afterwards Worcester College, Oxford), where he took his degrees in arts. He entered holy orders, and in 1637 acted as chaplain of Lincoln College. In the same year he moved to Hereford, where he became master of Hereford Cathedral School, vicar-choral, and soon after, Vicar of All Hallows there. When Hereford garrison was taken by the parliamentary army in 1646, he retreated to Sudeley Castle to shelter with the Chandos family, to which he acted as chaplain in the opening years of the civil war.

Later he found refuge at Hawling, Gloucestershire, in the Cotswold district, where he taught at a private school with success and had several pupils of rank. There he composed his Nympha Libethris, or the Cotswold Muse, presenting some extempore Verses to the Imitation of yong Scholars (1651). At the Restoration he was presented to the livings of Naunton near Hawling, and of Stow-on-the-Wold in Gloucestershire, which he retained until his death in January 1687 in his 79th year, when (says Anthony à Wood) he left behind him "the character of a frequent and edifying preacher and a good neighbour".

Works
His major works are:
Monumenta Literaria: sive Obitus et Elogia doctorum Virorum, ex Historiis Jac. Aug. Thuani, 1640
A Short Practical Catechism out of Dr. Hammond, with a Paper Monument, 1649
Adagilia Sacra Novi Testamenti … ab Andr. Schotto, 1651
Nympha Libethris, or the Cotswold Muse, 4 parts, 1651 
Life of Hugo Grotius, 1652
Noctes Hibernæ: Winter Nights' Exercise, 1653
V. cl. Elogia Anglorum Camdeniana,1653
The Disputation at Whinchcombe, 9 Nov. 1653, 1653
An Oxford Conference of Two Young Scholars touching their Studies, 1659
A Modest Reply in Three Letters touching the Clergy and Universities, 1659
 Sermons, separately published:The Sacrifice,1655;King's Return, 1660; on 2 Samuel xv. 25, 1660; on Psalm cxxii. 6, 1680
Of Contentment, 1660, 4th edit. 1679
Defence of the Liturgy, 1661
Memorials of Worthy Persons, 1661
Remembrances of Excellent Men, 1670
Masora: a Collection out of the learned Master J. Buxtorfius's Comment. Masoreticus, 1665
Collection of Scripture illustrated by Mr. Richard Hooker, 1675
Three Ministers, … their Collections and Notices touching several Texts at their Weekly Meeting, 1675
Letter touching a College of Maids or a Virgin Society, 1675
Hugonis Grotii Annot. Selectæ ad vii. cap. S. Matthæi, 1675
Behold the Husbandman, 1677
Learn to die,1679
Bezæ Epitaphia Selecta, 1680
Sententiæ Sacræ, 1680
Aurea Dicta: the King's gracious Words, 1681
Memorials of Alderman Whitmore, Bp. Wilkins, Reynolds, etc. 1681
Religion in Verse, 1683
Old Gentleman's Wish, 1684
Of Authors and Books, 1684
Century of Sacred Distichs, or Religion in Verse,(this was Religion in Verse enlarged)
Grateful Mention of Deceased Bishops, 1686

He made also translations of books and tractates by Cyprian, Grotius, Anna Maria van Schurman, and others.

See also
List of Old Abingdonians

References

1609 births
1687 deaths
17th-century English writers
17th-century English male writers
17th-century English educators
Schoolteachers from Gloucestershire
English chaplains
People from Winchcombe
Alumni of Merton College, Oxford
17th-century English Anglican priests
People educated at Abingdon School